Lenny or Lennie is a given name, often a nickname for Leonard, and may refer to:

People

In sports
 Leonard Lenny Dykstra (born 1963), American former Major League Baseball player
 Lenny Fernandes Coelho (born 1988), Brazilian footballer 
 Leonard Lennie Friedman (born 1976), American former National Football League player
 Lenny Hayes (born 1980), former Australian rules footballer
 Leonid Lenny Krayzelburg (born 1975), Ukrainian-born American swimmer, four-time Olympic gold medalist
 Jan Leonardus Lennie Louw (born 1959), South African-born Namibian cricketer
 Lenny Permana (born 1975), female badminton player from Australia
 Lenny Rodrigues, Indian footballer playing for FC Goa
 Lennie Rosenbluth (born 1933), American former college basketball and National Basketball Association player
 Lenny Wilkens (born 1937), American former National Basketball Association player and coach, member of several Halls of Fame as player and coach
Lennie Waite (born 1986), British female track and field athlete

In music
 Lenny Fontana (active from 1985), American house music DJ
 Lennie Hayton (1908-1971), American composer and conductor
 Lenny Kaye (born 1946), American musician, composer and writer, guitarist of Patti Smith Group
 Leonard Lenny Kravitz (born 1964), American rock/hard rock singer, songwriter, producer and guitarist
 Lenny Waronker (born 1941), American record label executive and producer

In film and television
 Lenny Clarke (born 1953), actor, writer, and producer
 Lenny Henry (born 1958), British stand-up comedian, actor, writer and television presenter
 Lennie James (born 1965), British actor
 Leonard Alfred Schneider Lenny Bruce (1925-1966),an American stand-up comedian, social critic, and satirist

Other
 Leonard DiMaria (born 1941), New York mobster
 Hugh Leonard Lenny Murphy (1952-1982), psychopathic killer from Northern Ireland, member of the paramilitary Ulster Volunteer Force
 Lenny Montana (1926–1992), professional wrestler and mob enforcer turned film actor

Fictional characters
 Lenny (bot), a chat bot designed to disrupt telemarketer calls
 Lennie Small, principal character in the John Steinbeck novel, Of Mice and Men
 Lenny Kosnowski, in the television series, Laverne and Shirley
 Lenny Leonard, a recurring character in the television series, The Simpsons
 Lenny, in the animated film, Toy Story
 Lenny Feder, in the films Grown Ups and Grown Ups 2
 Lenny Parker, in the television series, Mona the Vampire
 Lenny, in the animated film, Shark Tale
 Lenny, a neopet
 Leni Loud, in the animated series, The Loud House
 Lennie Briscoe, on the television series, Law and Order
 Lenny Summers, in the video game Red Dead Redemption 2
Lenny, a recurring character in Fanboy and Chum Chum

See also
 Lenny the Lion (disambiguation) 

English masculine given names
English-language masculine given names
Hypocorisms

fr:Lenny
hu:Lenny